Frederica is a feminine given name meaning "peaceful ruler". It is closely related to the masculine name Frederick, of Germanic origin. Its meaning is derived from the Germanic word elements frid, or peace, and ric, meaning "ruler" or "power".

Notable people with the name include:

Frederica Chase Dodd (1893—1972), American social worker
Frederica Darema, Greek American physicist
Frederica Detmers (1867 — 1934), American botanist
Frederica Freyberg, American television anchor and producer
Frederica Going (1895 - 1959), American actress
Frederica Jansz, Sri Lankan journalist
Frederica de Laguna (1906 – 2004), American ethnologist, anthropologist, and archaeologist
Frederica Sagor Maas (1900 – 2012), American dramatist and playwright
Frederica Massiah-Jackson (born 1951), American judge
Frederica Mathewes-Green (born 1952), American author and speaker
Frederica Perera (born 1941), American environmental health scientist
Frederica Piedade (born 1982), retired Portuguese tennis player
Frederica Plunket (1838– 1886), Irish aristocrat
Frederica Maclean Rowan (1814 – 1882), British author and translator
Frederica von Stade (born 1945), American singer
Frederica J. Turle (born 1880), British author of juvenile fiction
Frederica Williams (born 1958), American health administrator
Frederica Wilson (born 1942), American politician

Variants
Bedřicha - Czech
Federica - Italian, Spanish
Freddy - English
Freddie - English
Freddi - English
Freddey - English
Frederica - English, Portuguese
Frederikke - Danish
Frédérique - French
Frédérika - French
Fredrika - Finnish, Swedish
Frici - Hungarian
Friederike - German
Friðrika - Icelandic
Fritzi - German
Fryderyka - Polish
Φρειδερίκη (Freiderikē) - Greek
Miroslava - Czech
Rica - English
Riika - Finnish
Riikka - Finnish
Rika - Dutch, Swedish
Rike - German
Rikke - Danish
 Frederiek Dutch

See also
 Frederica (disambiguation)
 Princess Frederica (disambiguation)

References

Feminine given names